Urania Mella Serrano, (Vigo, 1900 - Lugo, 1945) was a Galician politician, and forerunner of the women's associationism. Her father was the anarchist intellectual Ricardo Mella Cea, and her mother, Esperanza Serrano, was the daughter of Juan Serrano Oteiza, a well-known anarchist from Madrid and founder of the magazine Revista Social. Urania was president of the viguese branch of the Union of Antifascist Women.

1900 births
1945 deaths
People from Vigo
Politicians from Galicia (Spain)
Spanish women in politics